Eiði Municipality is a municipality of the Faroe Islands. It is part of the Eysturoy region, and consists of a northwesterly part of the Eysturoy island. The municipality borders Runavík Municipality to the east and Sunda Municipality to the south and east. The population of the municipality is 810 (2023). The mayor of the municipality is Rógvi Egilstoft, and the municipal council consists of seven members elected every four years.

The municipality contains Lake Eiði, which is situated between Eiði and Ljósá on the northwest side of Eysturoy. The Breiðá River flows nearby. Eiði power plant, the largest hydroelectric power station in the Faroe Islands, lies on the lake. The power plant opened in 1987, and is owned by the power producer and distributor SEV.

History
The village of Eiði is first mentioned in texts in the 14th century, but carbon dating suggests that Norsemen founded the settlement already in the 9th century. The area of the modern Eiði Municipality came under Norðoya Prestagjalds Municipality in 1872 where the prestegjeld municipalities were founded. In 1879 the locals of Eiði showed interest in becoming an independent municipality, which happened in 1894. The first mayor of the new municipality became Grækaris Joensen. In 1943 the municipality was divided, with three of the municipality's six villages forming their own municipality: Sunda Municipality. This officially went into effect on 1 January 1944. The borders of the new Eiði Municipality has remained unchanged since then.

Settlements
Eiði Municipality consists of three villages. These villages are listed in the table below, with populations from January 2021.

Eiði

Eiði is the seat of the municipality, located in the northern part of the municipality, south of the Niðara Vatn lake and north west of Lake Eiði. Eiði borders the Sundini sound to the south. The southern parts of Eiði mainly consists of an industrial fishery harbour. North of the harbour is Eiði Church and the associated cemetery. The central parts of Eiði consists of mainly residential buildings, with a few facilities. Among these facilities is a local history museum and a school. The school was built 1965. North of the village is a discontinued football field, now used by Eiði Camping as camping ground.

Located just east of Eiði is the LORAN-C transmitter Ejde. It was an important station for submarine navigation during the Cold War, and in the 1960s the number of employees at the station were at 32. Today there are 2 employees at the station, and although the American support for the station was stopped in 1994, it is still in use.

Nature

Lake Eiði (Faroese: Eiðisvatn) is the fifth largest lake in the Faroe Islands. The Breiðá river goes out from the lake and into the ocean. The lake is a popular fishing spot, home to fish such as sea trout, charr, river trout and rainbow trout. The black-legged kittiwake is common around the lake.

The Slættaratindur is the highest mountain in the Faroe Islands, located east of the village of Eiði. The mountain is 880 meters tall.

Politics
The municipality's municipal council consists of seven municipal councillors, elected every four years. The municipal council has five political committees.

From 1894 and until 1975 the municipal council consisted of five members. Since 1975 it has consisted of seven members.

Mayors
Since the municipality was founded in 1894, the mayors of Eiði Municipality have been:

Energy
Eiði power plant is a hydroelectric power plant, located at Lake Eiði. It is the largest of is kind on the Faroe Islands. The power plant is owned by SEV. The first turbine of the plant was started on April 28, 1987 and expansions were made in 1997 and 2000.

Demographics

There are 767 people living in Eiði Municipality (2021). 54.63% are men and 45.37% are women.

Below is the age distribution of the municipality.

Education
Eiði School (Faroese: Eiðis skúli) is located in the western part of the village of Eiði. The school goes up to 7th grade, with students transferring to Streymin School (Faroese: Skúlin við Streymin) in Oyrarbakki for 8th, 9th and 10th grade. The municipality also has a kindergarten, which opened in 2008.

Sights

The municipality's small size means that there are few attractions. The village of Eiði does have a local history museum. This museum is called Látrið, and it is located centrally in Eiði, set in a restored farmhouse from 1840. Also located in Eiði is Eiði Church, located centrally in the village. It was founded on September 18, 1881 and was designed in 1879 by Danish architect Hans Christian Amberg.

Sport
The main football club in Eiði Municipality was Eiðis Bóltfelag, established in 1913, but it merged with Streymur Hvalvik in 1993 to form EB/Streymur. The club's home ground is based in Streymnes.

Notable residents
Grækaris Joensen (1835 in Eiði — 1897), teacher, politician and the first mayor of the municipality
Jógvan Poulsen (1854 in Svínáir — 1941), teacher, writer and politician
Hans Pauli Samuelsen (born 1984 in Eiði), football player
Arnbjørn Hansen (born 1986 in Eiði), football player
Doris Olafsdóttir (born 1986 in Eiði), football player

References

External links
The municipality's official website

Municipalities of the Faroe Islands